Dreamlanders are the cast and crew of regulars whom John Waters has used in his films. The term comes from the name of Waters' production company, Dreamland Productions.

Many of the original Dreamlanders were friends of Waters from his native Baltimore, Maryland. They included the "bad suburban kids" he knew from Towson and Lutherville: Bob Skidmore, Mark Isherwood, and Mary Vivian Pearce. This crowd was drawn to downtown Baltimore by the gay scene, where Divine introduced Waters to David Lochary.

History
The original Dreamlanders also included denizens of the Fells Point neighborhood where Waters' art director, Vincent Peranio, a recent graduate of Maryland Institute College of Art, had rented an industrial space that once housed a commercial bakery with seven other Maryland Institute graduates, to use as cheap studio and living space. They called it the Hollywood Bakery. In Fells Point, the Dreamlanders were regular customers at Pete's Hotel, Bertha's, and Jimmy's. In addition to Peranio, the Fells Point Dreamlanders included Mink Stole, George Figgs, Bob Adams, Susan Lowe, Paul Swift, Chris Mason, and Peter Koper.

Although Waters has attempted to include many of the same actors and production team members in every film, not every Dreamlander is used in each of his films. This is frequently the result of the death of an actor, as was the case with Maelcum Soul, Edith Massey, Divine, and David Lochary. Other actors such as Jean Hill and Ricki Lake have not been used in every film, but appear occasionally.

Typically Waters would discover an actor and continue to use them in subsequent films. Most notably, Mary Vivian Pearce is the only Dreamlander to appear in every one of Waters' films, although her scenes in Cry-Baby were cut. Mink Stole has appeared in all of Waters' feature films, but does not appear in the early short films Hag in a Black Leather Jacket (1964), Eat Your Makeup (1967), and The Diane Linkletter Story (1969). Although many Dreamlanders have a prolific history with Waters, the distinction of being a Dreamlander is generally bequested upon anyone who has made more than one Waters film, such as Traci Lords who appeared in Cry-Baby (1990) and Serial Mom (1994). Danny Mills is sometimes considered a Dreamlander despite only appearing in the 1972 film Pink Flamingos.

The Dreamlanders

References

 All the Dirt on "A Dirty Shame" 2004
 John Waters DVD Scrapbook 2005
 Curley, Mallory. A Cookie Mueller Encyclopedia, Randy Press, 2010

External links
 Dreamland website
 Dreamland's archive of articles

Performing groups
John Waters
Groups of entertainers

es:John Waters#Dreamlanders